LNO may refer to:

Liaison officer, person that liaises between two organizations to communicate and coordinate there activities
Leonora Airport, IATA airport code LNO
Loop nest optimization, method for optimising source code
Member of the Order of the Polar Star